Chander Mohan Bishnoi, is an Indian politician and former Deputy Chief Minister of Haryana. He is elder son of former Chief Minister of Haryana Bhajanlal Bishnoi. He is currently a member of Indian National Congress, while previously he was a member of Haryana Janhit Congress party. He has been elected as member of Haryana's legislative assembly consecutively 4 times from Kalka Constituency.

Early life and education 
Bishnoi was born in a political family of Haryana. His father Bhajan Lal was a former Chief minister of Haryana, while his younger brother, Kuldip Bishnoi is also a politician. Bishnoi was educated at the Lawrence School, Sanawar.

References

External links
 Government of Haryana official site

1965 births
Living people
Lawrence School, Sanawar alumni
Deputy chief ministers of Haryana
Members of the Haryana Legislative Assembly
State cabinet ministers of Haryana
Indian National Congress politicians
Place of birth missing (living people)